James Coughlan (born 28 August 1990) is a New Zealand field hockey player. He represented his country at the 2016 Summer Olympics in Rio de Janeiro, where the men's team came seventh.

References

External links
 
 
 

1990 births
Living people
Olympic field hockey players of New Zealand
New Zealand male field hockey players
Field hockey players at the 2016 Summer Olympics
20th-century New Zealand people
21st-century New Zealand people